Shimao is a Neolithic site in Shenmu County, Shaanxi, China.  The site is located in the northern part of the Loess Plateau, on the southern edge of the Ordos Desert.  It is dated to around 2000 BC, near the end of the Longshan period, and is the largest known walled site of that period in China, at 400 ha. The fortifications of Shimao were originally believed to be a section of the Great Wall of China, but the discovery of jade pieces prompted an archaeological investigation, which revealed that the site was of Neolithic age.

The city was surrounded by inner and outer stone walls, in contrast to the rammed earth walls typical of Longshan sites in the Central Plain and Shandong. The walls were 2.5 meters thick on average, with perimeters of approximately 4200 m and 5700 m respectively, and feature gates, turrets and watch towers. The earliest site, the "palace centre", was a large stepped pyramid based on a loess hill which had been reworked to make 11 platforms, with a height of 70m. Each of these was reinforced by stone buttresses. At the top of this pyramid palaces of rammed earth were built. The inner city contained a stone-walled platform, interpreted as a palatial complex, and densely packed residential zones, cemeteries and craft workshops. Unusual features include jade embedded in the city walls, possibly to provide spiritual protection, relief sculptures of serpents and monsters, and paintings of geometrical patterns on the inner walls. Approximately 80 human skulls were found under the city gate, mainly of young girls, suggesting ritual sacrifice.

Developments such as bronze working, wheat, barley, sheep, goats and cattle seem to appear here earlier than elsewhere in China, showing that its inhabitants were communicating with Eurasian Steppe peoples across extensive trade networks. Additionally, materials likely from Southern China, such as alligator skin drums, have been found, indicating a north-south commerce across what is now modern China. Thin curved bones discovered at Shimao are believed to be the earliest known evidence of the jaw harp, an instrument that has spread to over 100 different ethnic groups, suggesting possible Chinese origins.

The prevailing hypothesis concerning the abandonment of Shimao is tied to a rapid shift to a cooler, drier climate on the Loess Plateau, from 2000 to 1700 BC. This environmental change likely led populations to shift to the Central Plain, leaving the site to be forgotten until the 21st century.

Gallery

References 

Archaeological sites in China
Former populated places in China
Major National Historical and Cultural Sites in Shaanxi
Yulin, Shaanxi
23rd-century BC establishments